Angel Street Bride is a 2021 Iranian comedy-drama film directed by Mehdi Khosravi.

Plot 
The Mohajer family lives in an old house in the heart of Fereshteh (Angel) Street, which belongs to the family's uncle. Each member of the family makes a living from the space of this house in some way. With the return of the uncle of the family after many years with his bride from outside Iran with the intention of selling the old house of the Mohajer family, he causes big challenges and troubles...

Cast 
 Mohammad-Reza Sharifinia
 Alireza Jafari
 Atefeh Razavi
 Mehraveh Sharifinia
 Pouria Poursorkh
 Shaghayegh Farahani
 Helia Emami
 Hesam Navab Safavi 
 Kamand AmirSoleimani
 Mojtaba Shafiei
 Fahimeh Rahimian
 Sam Nouri
 Ramin Naser Nasir
 Tara Attar
 Molood Mousavi

References

External links

2021 films
2021 comedy-drama films
2020s Persian-language films
Iranian comedy-drama films